Ketton stone is a Jurassic oolitic limestone, cream to pale yellow or pink in colour,  used as a building stone since the 16th century. It is named after the village of Ketton in Rutland, England. It was used as freestone, mostly in buildings outside Rutland, particularly in Cambridge, where it was used in many of the colleges.

Nowadays, the major quarry at Ketton produces limestone for the adjoining Ketton Cement Works but selected stone is still set aside for cut building blocks.

Notable buildings

 Wren Library, Cambridge
 Pembroke College Chapel
 Emmanuel College Chapel
 Burghley House
 Haymarket Memorial Clock Tower

See also
List of types of limestone

References

Limestone
Building stone
Ketton